Hurrungane (also written Hurrungene, Hurrungadn, Horungane) is a mountain range in the municipalities Luster and Årdal in Vestland county, Norway. The area is southwest in the larger mountain range Jotunheimen and is also part of Jotunheimen National Park.

Several of the peaks are only accessible through climbing or glacier crossings. The starting point for hiking is the village of Turtagrø along the national tourist road, Sognefjellsvegen (RV55).

The highest peaks in the area are
 Store Skagastølstinden (Storen): 
 Store Styggedalstinden: 
 Jervvasstind (Gjertvasstind): 
 Sentraltind: 
 Vetle Skagastølstind: 
 Midtre Skagastølstind: 
 Skagastølsnebbet: 
 Store Austanbotntind:

Name
Hurrungane is the finite plural of a word hurrung. Hurrungen, the finite singular of the same word, is the names of two mountains in Rauma and Skjåk. The first element is the verb hurra which means "hurry, move fast (with noise and roar)".  The last element is the suffix -ung, referring to an active thing/person.  The actual mountains are steep, and there are frequent rockslides and avalanches from the hillsides. The meaning of the name is then "the noisemakers".

See also
List of mountains of Norway

References

Mountain ranges of Norway
Landforms of Vestland
Jotunheimen
Luster, Norway
Årdal